Natalia "Nato" Vachnadze, born Natalia Andronikashvili, (14 June 1904 – 14 June 1953) was a Georgian and Soviet film actress. She started her career in the silent film era, usually playing the screen character of an Ingénue, an innocent and passionate young woman. She continued to work as an actress during the sound era until her death in a plane crash in 1953. One of the first film stars of the Soviet Union she received numerous honors, including the title of People's Artist of the Georgian Soviet Socialist Republic and the Stalin Prize.

Biography
Nato Vachnadze was born in Warsaw, then in the Russian Empire as the daughter of a Georgian father George Andronikov from the Andronikashvili family and a Polish mother Ekaterina Slivitskaya. Her father, an officer in the Russian army, was killed in a skirmish with a band of Chechen outlaws (abrek) in 1912. She adopted her last name from her first marriage to Merab Vachnadze, with whom she had a son, Tengiz Vachnadze (born 1926), the future architect. Her second marriage was with the film director Nikoloz Shengelaia, with whom she had two sons, the film directors Giorgi Shengelaia and Eldar Shengelaia. Her third marriage was with the Soviet navy captain Anatoli Kacharava (1910–1982). Nato Vachnadze's younger sister, Kira (1908–1960), also became an actress and married the writer Boris Pilnyak.

Although several versions of her discovery for the film exist, the most popular and likely is that the film director Shakro Berishvili noticed her photography in a photo studio in Tbilisi. He managed to find her in Kakheti and convinced to play in her first film, the 1923 adventure film Arsen the Bandit. The role of Nunu in the 1923 film Patricide and the role of Esma in the 1924 film Three Lives made her famous not only in the Georgian Union Republic, but all over the Soviet Union. In these films her screen character was that of an Ingénue, an innocent and passionate young woman. The theater and film director Kote Marjanishvili gave Vachnadze two challenging roles in the experimental films The Gadfly and Amok adapted from novels by Ethel Voynich and Stefan Zweig. By now not only a national, but also an international star she played the gypsy woman Masha in the German-Soviet film The Living Corpse, adapted from the Leo Tolstoy play The Living Corpse.

Vachnadze was – together with her male colleague Igor Ilyinsky – one of the first film stars of the young Soviet Union, and was sometimes called the Soviet Vera Kholodnaya, after the first film star of the Russian empire, Vera Kholodnaya. Indicators for her stardom are the appearance of her name in film advertisements and the publication of two pulp biographies printed in nearly 100,000 copies. Her screen character was decidedly different from the screen characters of other actresses. Most Soviet actresses in the 1920s were relegated to playing either the role of a traditional or proletarian heroine. Vachnadze in contrast played glamorous women with private lives – presumably her exotic Georgian origin allowed her more freedoms on the screen than a Russian actress would have had. Unusual for Soviet cinema most of her films were steamy melodramas in which she acted with considerable passion and emotion. Yevgenia Ginzburg described her as a "dovelike heroine" and as "an eternal victim" in his memoirs. The writer Viktor Shklovsky described her as "an artiste of the American type because her value lies in the purity of her ethnographic type".

With the emergence of the sound film Vachnadze decided to have a time out. Following a recommendation by Grigori Kozintsev she went to Moscow where she worked for Esfir Shub as an assistant director. She then returned to Georgia, restarting her career in some of the earliest Georgian sound films such as the 1934 film The Last Crusaders and Mikheil Chiaureli's The Last Masquerade. She also played in films of her second husband, Nikoloz Shengelaia, including the silent film Giuli and The Golden Valley. Her last film was the 1952 film Conquerors of the Peaks directed by Davit Rondeli.

As the first star of Georgian and Soviet cinema she was both named a People's Artist of the Georgian Soviet Socialist Republic and was awarded a Stalin Prize in 1941. She was named an Honored Artist of the Russian Soviet Federative Socialist Republic and received three Orders of the Red Banner of Labour. In 1943 she also became a member of the Communist Party of the Soviet Union. Vachnadze died in a plane crash in 1953. Shortly before her death the poet and writer Boris Pasternak addressed her during a visit to his country house. He said about Nato Vachnadze "Your beauty evokes a desire [in us] to kneel down before you!".

After her death she received several honors. A street in Tbilisi and a product tanker of the Georgian Shipping Company was named after her from 1985 to 1995. The Georgian film award is named Nato in her honor. In 1981 the Nato Vachnadze House Museum opened on the family estate in Gurjaani, Kakheti.

Filmography

Notes
 In Russian sources also Natalya Georgievna Andronikasvhili.

References

External links

1904 births
1953 deaths
20th-century actresses from Georgia (country)
Actresses from Warsaw
Andronikashvili family
Communist Party of the Soviet Union members
Honored Artists of the RSFSR
People's Artists of Georgia
Stalin Prize winners
Recipients of the Order of the Red Banner of Labour
Film actresses from Georgia (country)
Silent film actresses from Georgia (country)
Soviet film actresses
Soviet silent film actresses
Victims of aviation accidents or incidents in 1953
Victims of aviation accidents or incidents in the Soviet Union
Burials at Didube Pantheon